Campylotes histrionicus is a day-flying moth of the family Zygaenidae found in Asia, including northern India, Vietnam and Nepal. In India, it is found throughout the Himalayas. It is black with red and orange streaks and white spots resembling the pattern of Danaus genutia. The binomial name was given by John O. Westwood in 1839.

References

External links
Digital Moths of Japan

Chalcosiinae
Moths of Asia
Moths described in 1839